Immortalis is the 14th studio album by American thrash metal band Overkill. It was released in 2007 on Bodog Records. It is a pun of "Immortal15", and was preceded by Killbox 13 and ReliXIV (with the Roman XIV for 14). The album sold over 2,800 copies in its first week of release in the U.S and as of 2009, Immortalis sold over 15,000 copies in the U.S. 

This was also the first Overkill studio album to include drummer Ron Lipnicki, who joined the band shortly after the release of its predecessor ReliXIV (2005).

Track listing

Asian bonus track

Bonus CD/DVD version

Credits
 Bobby "Blitz" Ellsworth - lead vocals
 D.D. Verni - bass, backing vocals
 Dave Linsk - lead guitar
 Derek Tailer - rhythm guitar
 Ron Lipnicki - drums

Additional personnel
 Randy Blythe - vocals on "Skull and Bones"
 Bodog Music

Charts

References

External links
 Official OVERKILL Site

Overkill (band) albums
2007 albums